Andrei Olhovskiy won in the final 7–6 (7–5), 6–2 against Mark Knowles.

Seeds
A champion seed is indicated in bold text while text in italics indicates the round in which that seed was eliminated.

  Jeff Tarango (quarterfinals)
  Tim Henman (semifinals)
  Oleg Ogorodov (second round)
  Michael Tebbutt (semifinals)
  Marcos Ondruska (quarterfinals)
  Andrei Olhovskiy (champion)
  Steve Campbell (first round)
  Tommy Ho (second round)

Draw

External links
 ATP main draw

Kingfisher Airlines Tennis Open
1996 ATP Tour